The Raleigh North Carolina Temple is the 68th operating temple of the Church of Jesus Christ of Latter-day Saints (LDS Church).

History
Groundbreaking services for the Raleigh North Carolina Temple, located in Apex, North Carolina, were held on February 6, 1999. After the temple was completed, about 31,000 people toured the temple during the public open house. LDS Church president Gordon B. Hinckley dedicated the temple on December 18, 1999.

The temple features art glass windows and a white marble exterior. The modern design features a lone spire topped with a gold statue of the angel Moroni.

On June 27, 2017, the LDS Church announced that beginning January 2018, the temple would close for renovations that were completed in 2019. On May 3, 2019, the church announced the public open house that was held from September 21 through 28, 2019, excluding Sunday. The temple was rededicated on Sunday, October 13, 2019, by M. Russell Ballard.

In 2020, the Raleigh North Carolina Temple was closed in response to the coronavirus pandemic.

See also

 Comparison of temples of The Church of Jesus Christ of Latter-day Saints
 List of temples of The Church of Jesus Christ of Latter-day Saints
 List of temples of The Church of Jesus Christ of Latter-day Saints by geographic region
 Temple architecture (Latter-day Saints)
 The Church of Jesus Christ of Latter-day Saints in North Carolina

References

Additional reading

External links
 
Raleigh North Carolina Temple Official site
Raleigh North Carolina Temple at ChurchofJesusChristTemples.org

20th-century Latter Day Saint temples
Churches in Raleigh, North Carolina
Religious buildings and structures in North Carolina
Temples (LDS Church) completed in 1999
The Church of Jesus Christ of Latter-day Saints in North Carolina
Temples (LDS Church) in the United States
1999 establishments in North Carolina